Venus Williams was the defending champion, but lost in quarterfinals to Meghann Shaughnessy.

Kim Clijsters won the title by defeating Lindsay Davenport 6–4, 6–7(5–7), 6–1 in the final.

Seeds
The first four seeds received a bye into the second round.

Draw

Finals

Top half

Bottom half

References
 Official Results Archive (ITF)
 Official Results Archive (WTA)

Bank of the West Classic - Singles
Silicon Valley Classic